Ethel Isabel Lang  (1902 – November 1995), also known as Ethel Brunton, was an Australian actress prominent as a pioneering local radio performer during the 1930s, but also appeared in numerous stage roles. From the age of seven she appeared in school plays and concerts before being asked to play Napoleon's son in The Royal Divorce. Stage roles included Shakespeare's Macbeth and The Merchant of Venice

Radio career
Her career in radio began in 1924, and while raising a family during The Depression, World War II and beyond, she had an independent career:
Leading parts in ABC radio feature plays 1930–40.
in One Man's Family for commercial radio 2SM.
as "Aunt Jenny" in Aunt Jenny's Real Life Stories for commercial radio 2UE 1943–51.
as Mrs Lawson in the long-running ABC serial The Lawsons, then as Mary "Meg" MacArthur in its even longer-running sequel "Blue Hills".
minor parts in other commercial radio serials, including When a Girl Marries and Mary Livingstone MD.

Like her husband James Brunton Gibb, she was generous in her support of charitable events, notably Legacy. On occasion, she adjudicated at eisteddfods and produced performances by the Brunton Gibb Players, when she used her married name.

Recognition
She was made a Member of the Order of Australia (AM) in 1992 for services to the arts and community.

Personal life
Lang married actor and elocution teacher James Brunton Gibb (13 January 1897 – 28 June 1968) on 1 September 1923; they frequently appeared on stage together. Their children were:
Peter Brunton Gibb (1924–2011) served with the RAAF during WWII and married Patricia Saunders in 1946.
Judith Wendy Brunton Gibb (1925– ), professionally known as Wendy Brunton Gibb
Barbara Joan Brunton Gibb (1927–2014), professionally known as Barbara Brunton, married journalist Stuart Revill (1929–2019) in 1952. Revill had various positions with the ABC between 1959 and 1992.
David Brunton Gibb (1939– )
The whole family used "Brunton" as though it were part of their surname.

Family 
Peter and Wendy Brunton Gibb both excelled in elocution.
Wendy appeared in the 1949 film Sons of Matthew, left for London and joined Dan O'Connor's British Commonwealth Players and in 1953 became Mrs Michael Benge.

Barbara was educated at Fort Street High School and worked as a radio and stage actress associated with Doris Fitton's Independent Theatre and Mercury Theatre

David became Professor of Anaesthetics and Intensive Care at UNSW in 2001. He is commemorated at Sydney High School by the David Brunton Gibb Prize for Soccer.

References

Sources
 Library Of New South Wales website
 National Film and Sound Archive

External links
 Read more about Ethel Lang, listen to excerpts of her work and an oral history interview with her on the National Film and Sound Archive website.
 For more context on women in early radio in Australia visit the National Film and Sound Archive's Women in Early Radio collection.
 

1902 births
1995 deaths
Australian radio actresses
20th-century Australian actresses
Members of the Order of Australia